ANQ can stand for:

 ANQ (journal) (ANQ: American Notes and Queries), a quarterly academic journal
 Jarawa language (Andaman Islands) (ISO 639:anq)
 Archives nationales du Québec (National Archives of Quebec), now the Bibliothèque et Archives nationales du Québec, Canada
 Tri-State Steuben County Airport (IATA: ANQ)